The 1998 Florida Gators football team represented the University of Florida during the 1998 NCAA Division I-A football season was the Florida Gators football team's ninth under head coach Steve Spurrier. [Spurrier's 1998 Florida Gators compiled an overall record of 10–2 and a Southeastern Conference (SEC) record of 7–1, placing second among the six teams of the SEC Eastern Division.

Schedule

Rankings

Season summary

Tennessee
After Peyton Manning and several other star players moved on to the NFL after the 1997 season, most preseason prognosticators saw Tennessee's 1998 squad as taking a step backward from championship contention. However, they were still ranked No. 6 when the No. 2 Gators rolled into Knoxville looking to beat their rivals for the sixth consecutive year.

It was not to be. Led by junior quarterback Tee Martin and a stout defense, the Vols recovered four Gators fumbles, held their opponent to -30 yards rushing, and slowed UF's two-quarterback passing attack, which featured Doug Johnson and Jesse Palmer alternating plays.  The game was close throughout, with the score knotted at 10 at halftime and 17 at the end of regulation.  Tennessee was held to a Jeff Hall field goal during their first possession of overtime.  When it was UF's turn, placekicker Collins Cooper missed an answering field goal, giving UT a 20–17 win and inspiring the jubilant home fans to rush the turf of Neyland Stadium and tear down the goalposts.

Florida State

This 1998 battle between the in state rivals started before the whistle even blew.  A pre-game fight caused Florida's starting senior safety, Tony George, and a couple walk-on FSU players who were not even dressed, to be ejected from the game.  In the midst of the fight, it is rumored that Florida quarterback Doug Johnson attempted to peg FSU coach Bobby Bowden with a football.  Johnson did later apologize to Bowden, claiming that he had no target, he just threw the ball.  Florida State's defense came in the ballgame rated No. 1 in the nation, Florida's defense was rated No. 1 in the SEC, so the game was set to be a defensive battle.  Florida struck first with a 50-yard Doug Johnson touchdown pass, but Seminoles Peter Warrick and Travis Minor put the Seminoles in scoring position twice and Placekicker Sebastian Janikowski kicked two field goals to make the game 7–6.  After a Florida punt the Seminoles were at their own 5-yard-line and Florida forced a safety. And then Doug Johnson drove Florida deep into Florida State territory after the safety kick, but Florida State's defense stiffened and forced Florida to settle for three points.  At halftime, the game was 12–6, Florida.

In the second half Florida State's defense held Florida scoreless. Florida State's first touchdown of the game came when Seminoles quarterback Marcus Outzen connected with Peter Warrick on a touchdown throw, then later in the game, Peter Warrick threw a touchdown to Ron Dugans. The game ended 23–12, with Florida State the winner.

References

Florida
Florida Gators football seasons
Orange Bowl champion seasons
Florida Gators football